Namounou is a department or commune of Tapoa Province in eastern Burkina Faso. Its capital lies at the town of Namounou.

Towns and villages

References

Departments of Burkina Faso
Tapoa Province